Jan Hauser (born 19 January 1985 in Glarus) is a Swiss curler from Zürich. He currently plays third for Ralph Stöckli.

Hauser was a fairly successful junior curler. In his third World Junior Curling Championships, in 2003, he skipped Switzerland to a bronze medal finish.

In 2007, he joined forces with Stöckli, as his third. At his first World Championship in 2007, the team finished fourth. He returned to the World Championships with Stöckli in 2009.

In February 2010 he represented Team Switzerland at the 2010 Winter Olympics in Vancouver, British Columbia, Canada.

Teammates 
2010 Vancouver Olympic Games

Ralph Stöckli, Skip

Markus Eggler, Second

Simon Strübin, Lead

Toni Müller, Alternate

References

External links

1985 births
Living people
Swiss male curlers
Curlers at the 2010 Winter Olympics
Olympic curlers of Switzerland
Olympic bronze medalists for Switzerland
Olympic medalists in curling
Medalists at the 2010 Winter Olympics
People from Glarus